Newcastle Breakers Football Club was an Australian professional association football club based in Newcastle. The club was formed in 1991 was admitted into the National Soccer League in the 1991–92 season. The club had never qualified for the Finals series in the National Soccer League in all eight seasons of existence until they became defunct in 2000.

The list encompasses the records set by the club, their managers and their players. The player records section itemises the club's leading goalscorers and those who have made most appearances in first-team competitions. Attendance records in Newcastle are also included.

The club's record appearance maker is Andy Roberts, who made 169 appearances between 1978 and 1984. Warren Spink was Newcastle Breakers' record goalscorer, scoring 28 goals in total.

Player records

Appearances
 Most league appearances: Andy Roberts, 164
 Most NSL Cup appearances: Glenn Sprod, 10

Most appearances
Competitive matches only, includes appearances as substitute. Numbers in brackets indicate goals scored.

Goalscorers
 Most goals in a season: John Buonavoglia, 16 goals (in the 1999–2000 season)

Top goalscorers
Warren Spink was the all-time top goalscorer for Newcastle Breakers.

Competitive matches only. Numbers in brackets indicate appearances made.

Club records

Matches

Firsts
 First National Soccer League match: Newcastle Breakers 0–2 Adelaide City, National Soccer League, 6 October 1991
 First NSL Cup match: Newcastle Breakers 0–3 Marconi Fairfield, First round, 20 November 1991

Record wins
 Record NSL win: 6–0 against Heidelberg United, National Soccer League, 26 December 1993
 Record NSL Cup win: 7–1 against Northern NSW Lions, First round, 12 September 1996

Record defeats
 Record NSL defeat: 0–6 against Melbourne Croatia, National Soccer League, 8 December 1991
 Record NSL Cup defeat: 0–3 against Marconi Fairfield, First round, 20 November 1991

Record consecutive results
 Record consecutive wins: 4
 from 26 November 1999 to 17 December 1999
 from 6 February 2000 to 25 February 2000
 Record consecutive defeats: 10, from 12 March 1996 to 28 April 1996
 Record consecutive draws: 4, from 26 December 1991 to 12 January 1992
 Record consecutive matches without a defeat: 10, from 19 November 1999 to 21 January 2000
 Record consecutive matches without a win: 17, from 12 October 1997 to 30 January 1998

Goals
 Most NSL goals scored in a season: 44 in 34 matches, National Soccer League, 1999–2000
 Fewest NSL goals scored in a season: 28 in 26 matches, National Soccer League, 1991–92
 Most NSL goals conceded in a season: 77 in 33 matches, National Soccer League, 1995–96
 Fewest NSL goals conceded in a season: 29 in 26 matches, National Soccer League, 1992–93

Points
 Most points in a season: 51 in 34 matches, National Soccer League, 1999–2000
 Fewest points in a season: 22 in 26 matches, National Soccer League, 1991–92

Attendances
 Highest attendance at Newcastle: 7,674, against Adelaide Force, National Soccer League, 21 January 2000
 Lowest attendance at Newcastle: 1,024, against Marconi Fairfield, National Soccer League, 20 November 1991

References

Newcastle Breakers
Records